Events from the year 1604 in France

Incumbents
 Monarch – Henry IV

Events

Births

5 April – Charles IV, Duke of Lorraine (died 1675)

Full date missing
Louis, Count of Soissons (died 1641)
Pierre Thierry, organ builder (died 1665)
Philippe Habert, poet (died 1637)
Simon Le Moyne, Jesuit priest (died 1665)
Olivier Patru, lawyer and writer (died 1681)
Jean Mairet, playwright (died 1686)

Deaths

Full date missing
Étienne Dupérac, architect, painter, engraver, and garden designer (born c.1525)

See also

References

1600s in France